Scientist Encounters Pac-Man is an album featuring the dub musician Scientist in 1982. It was produced by Linval Thompson and was released on Greensleeves Records. It was recorded at Channel One Studio, Kingston, Jamaica. The backing band was Roots Radics and the cover artwork was by Tony McDermott.

Track listing
All tracks composed by Linval Thompson

"Under Surveillance" – 2:56
"Prince's Wrath" – 3:08
"Space Invaders Re-Group" – 3:18
"World Cup Squad Lick Their Wounds" – 3:58
"Vampire Initiative" – 3:08
"Malicious Intent" – 3:41
"The Dark Secret of the Box" – 3:47
"S.O.S." – 3:31
"Man-Trap" – 3:01
"Look Out – Behind You!" – 2:33

References

Scientist (musician) albums
1982 albums
Dub albums
Greensleeves Records albums